Jowharestan (also Romanized as Jowharestān; also known as Jowharestan-e Pā’īn, Jowharestān-e Pā’īn, Jowharestān-e Soflá, and Jowharestān-e Soflī) is a village in Nurabad Rural District, Garkan-e Jonubi District, Mobarakeh County, Isfahan Province, Iran. At the 2006 census, its population was 884, in 226 families.

References 

Populated places in Mobarakeh County